The color wine or bordeaux, vinous, vinaceous, is a dark shade of red.  It is a representation of the typical color of red wine.

The first recorded use of wine as a color name in English was in 1705. The term "bordeaux" is also sometimes used to describe this color.

Variations of wine

Claret

At right is displayed the color claret.

Another name for this color is bordeaux.  

This color is a representation of the average color of bordeaux wine.  

The first recorded use of claret as a color name in English was in 1547.

Burgundy

Burgundy is a red color associated with the Burgundy wine of the same name, which in turn is named after the Burgundy region of France.

The first recorded use of "burgundy" as a color name in English was in 1881.

Wine dregs

Wine dregs, or dregs of wine, is a deep tone of the color wine. It refers to the color of the lees of wine which settle at the bottom of a wine vessel. The first recorded use of wine dregs as a color name in English was in 1924. This color and old gold are the official colors of the Phi Delta Chi and Delta Psi fraternities.

The normalized color coordinates for wine dregs are identical to old mauve, which was first recorded as a color name in English in 1925.

Wine in human culture
Fashion
 The color wine is often used in fashion for various articles of clothing.

Sports
 Wine is the primary color of the National Basketball Association (NBA)'s Cleveland Cavaliers, along with gold and black.
 Claret is a popular colour for Association Football clubs; it is used by FC Barcelona, Aston Villa F.C., Fluminense F.C., West Ham United F.C., Burnley F.C., Northampton Town F.C., Bradford City A.F.C., Scunthorpe United F.C. and Venezuela national team. Burgundy is being used by the Washington Commanders in the National Football League of gridiron football

See also
 List of colors

References

Shades of red